The USDA National Nutrient Database for Standard Reference is a database produced by the United States Department of Agriculture that provides the nutritional content of many generic and proprietary-branded foods. Released in August 2015 and revised in May 2016, the current release, Standard Reference 28 (SR28), contains "data on 8,800 food items and up to 150 food components". New releases occur about once per year. The database may be searched online, queried through a representational state transfer API, or downloaded.

In April 2019, the USDA changed the presentation of food composition in its database, renaming the project as FoodData Central.

FoodData Central 
FoodData Central is USDA's integrated data system that contains five types of data containing information on food and nutrient profiles:

 Standard Reference, using earlier approaches to determining nutrient profiles of foods in the marketplace, provides a comprehensive list of values for nutrients and food components that are derived from calculations and analyses.
 Foundation Foods includes nutrient values as well as extensive underlying metadata on commercially available foods.
 Experimental Foods currently links to relevant agricultural research data from multiple sources, such as the Agricultural Collaborative Research Outcomes System (AgCROS).
 Food and Nutrient Database for Dietary Studies (FNDDS) provides nutrient values for the foods and beverages reported in What We Eat in America, the dietary intake component of the National Health and Nutrition Examination Survey (NHANES).
 The USDA Global Branded Food Products Database contains nutrient data that appear on branded and private label foods provided by the food industry, from ILSI, GS1 US, 1WorldSync, Label Insight, and University of Maryland's Joint Institute for Food Safety and Applied Nutrition.

References

External links
 USDA FoodData Central

Nutrition
Food and drink in the United States
National Nutrient Database
Online databases
Scientific databases
Projects established in 2015
2015 in the United States
National Nutrient Database